The Canchim is a breed of beef cattle developed in Central Brazil by crossing European Charolais cattle with Indubrazil cattle already kept in Brazil where Asian Zebu type cattle are best suited to the tropical conditions. When compared with Zebu bulls, Canchim bulls produce the same number of calves, but heavier and of superior quality. Compared to European breeds, the Canchim bull produces calves with the same weight but in larger numbers. The fast-growing progeny, from crossbred zebu cows with Canchim bulls, can be slaughtered at 18 months old from feedlots after weaning, up to 24 months old from feedlots after grazing and at 30 months from grazing on the range.

Origin
Zebu cattle (Bos Indicus), introduced to Brazil in the last century, were extensively crossbred with herds of native cattle. The Indian breed, well known for its ability to survive in the tropics, adapted quickly to Brazil, and soon populated large areas, considerably improving Brazilian beef cattle breeding. Zebu cattle were however found to be inferior to the European breeds in growth rate and yield of meat. It became clear that the beef cattle population required genetic improvement. Simply placing European beef cattle (Bos Taurus), highly productive in temperate climates, in Central Brazil, would not produce good results, due to their inability to adapt to a tropical environment. Besides the climate, other factors such as the high occurrence of parasites, diseases and the very low nutritional value of the native forage were problems.

Formation of the breed
The European breed used in the formation of Canchim cattle was Charolais. In 1922 the Ministry of Agriculture imported Charolais cattle to the State of Goias, where they remained till 1936, when they were transferred to São Carlos in the State of São Paulo, to the Canchim Farm of the Government Research Station, EMBRAPA. From this herd originated the dams and sires utilised in the program of crossbreeding.

The main Zebu breed which contributed to the formation to the Canchim was the Indubrazil, although Guzerá and Nelore cattle were also used. Preference was given to the Indubrasil breed, due to the ease of obtaining large herds at reasonable prices, which would have been difficult with Gir, Nelore or Guzerá.

The alternative crossbreeding programs initiated in 1940 by Dr. Antonio Teixeira Viana had the objective of obtaining first, crossbreeds 5/8 Charolais and 3/8 Zebu and second, 3/8 Charolais x 5/8 Zebu, to evaluate which of the two was the most successful. The total number of Zebu cows utilized to produce the half-breeds was 368, of which 292 were Indubrasil, 44 Guzerá and 32 Nelore. All the animals produced were reared exclusively on the range. Control of parasites was done every 15 days and the animals were weighed at birth and monthly. The females were weighed up to 30 months and the males up to 40 months.
The data collected during various years of work, permitted an evaluation of the various degrees of crossbreeding. The conclusion was that the 5/8 Charolais and 3/8 Zebu was the most suitable, presenting an excellent frame for meat, precocious, resistance to heat and parasites, and a uniform coat. The first crossbred animals, 5/8 Charolais and 3/8 Zebu, were born in 1953. Thus was born a new type of beef cattle for Central Brazil, with the name CANCHIM, derived from the name of a tree very common in the region where the breed was developed. It was not until 1971 that the Brazilian Association of Canchim Cattle Breeders (ABCCAN) was formed, and on 11 November 1972 the Herd Book was initiated. On 18 May 1983 the Ministry of Agriculture, recognized Canchim type cattle as a Breed.

New bloodlines
The Canchim breed, being a synthetic breed, permits breeders, in the development of new crossbreeding systems, to use the breeds used to form the Canchim breed, besides the breed itself, in its development.

There are many Canchim breeders forming new blood lines. Today the Nelore breed totally dominates the Zebu breed in the formation of Canchim. American and French Charolais semen, from carefully selected bulls is also used and recommended by the ABCCAN to form new bloodlines.

Past Presidents of the Brazilian Association of Canchim Cattle Breeders
 Roberto Luiz de Souza Barros; 1971–1978
 Francisco Jacintho da Silveira; 1978–1982
 Diogo Antonio de Barros; 1984–1992
 João Paulo Marques Canto Porto; 1992–1997
 Peter Anthony Baines; 1997–2001
 Deniz Ferreira Ribeiro; 2001–2007
 Luiz Adelar Scheuer; 2007–2009

References

External links
 Extensive article at Embryoplus.com
 Breed society site in Portuguese

Cattle breeds
Cattle breeds originating in Brazil
São Carlos
Beef cattle breeds